Tada is a place in Tirupati district of Andhra Pradesh.

Transport 
National Highway 16, a part of Golden Quadrilateral highway network, bypasses the village.

References

External links

Towns in Tirupati district